Carlo Antonio Procaccini (born 1555) was an Italian painter of the late-Renaissance period.

He was the third son of Ercole, the brother of Camillo and Giulio Cesare the elder, and father of Ercole Procaccini the Younger (1605–1675). He was born at Bologna and initially trained by his father, though he excelled in painting landscapes and still-lifes with flowers and fruit, mainly in Milan.

References
    

1555 births
16th-century Italian painters
Italian male painters
Painters from Milan
Italian Renaissance painters
Mannerist painters
Italian still life painters
Year of death unknown